is a Japanese professional footballer who plays as a forward for  club Kashima Antlers.

Club statistics

References

External links
Profile at Kashima Antlers

1997 births
Living people
Association football people from Gunma Prefecture
Japanese footballers
Japan youth international footballers
J1 League players
J2 League players
Kashima Antlers players
Zweigen Kanazawa players
Tokushima Vortis players
Sagan Tosu players
Association football forwards